Varotari is a surname. Notable people with the surname include:

Dario Varotari the Elder ( 1539–1596), Italian painter, sculptor and architect 
Dario Varotari the Younger (active 1660), Italian painter, engraver and poet
Chiara Varotari (1584–1663), Italian Baroque painter